Češnjice is a small village in the Municipality of Lukovica in the eastern part of the Upper Carniola region of Slovenia.

Church

The parish church in the settlement is dedicated to Our Lady of Mount Carmel. In the 18th century it was a well-known pilgrimage place.

References

External links 

Češnjice on Geopedia

Populated places in the Municipality of Lukovica